Flamel may refer to:

People
 Nicolas Flamel (1340-1418) reputed to be an alchemist who concocted the philosopher's stone
 Perenelle Flamel (died 1397) reputed to be an alchemist, wife of Nicolas

Places
 House of Nicolas Flamel, a building that Nicolas Flamel once lived in, now a restaurant still a private home
 Rue Nicolas Flamel, a street in Paris, France, which contains the House of Nicolas Flamel

Other uses
 Nicolas Flamel (Harry Potter), a fictionalized version of Nicolas Flamel
 Perenelle Flamel (Harry Potter), a fictionalized version of Perenelle Flamel
 Flamel Technologies, a French pharma company